John Willie Kofi Harlley (9 May 1919 – 18 February 1982) was a Ghanaian police officer who was Vice Chairman of the National Liberation Council government and the first Inspector General of Police in Ghana from 1966 to 1969. He was a member of the three-man presidential commission which carried out presidential functions during the 1969 democratic transitional process in Ghana and in the first year of the Second Republic.

Early years and education
He was born at Akagla in the Volta Region which was then British Togoland under British jurisdiction following the World War I. He attended Presbyterian Schools at Boso and Akropong. He completed his elementary school education at Anloga Presbyterian School in 1936 and later enrolled into the Accra Academy where he had his secondary education from 1936 to 1939.

Pre-NLC career
He was an interpreter in Ewe and Twi at the district magistrate court, Accra. Then later at the Supreme Court of Ghana, before enlisting in the Gold Coast Police just a week before his 21st birthday in May 1940. He became an inspector in November 1952 and was selected for training at the Metropolitan Police College, Hendon (now Hendon Police College) in 1953. On his return to Ghana he progressed from the rank of assistant Superintendent of Police to become the commissioner of police in 1965.

NLC government
At the time of the February 24, 1966 coup d'état that removed the Convention People's Party government of Dr. Kwame Nkrumah, Harlley was the Commissioner of Police, making him the most senior police officer in the country. He was one of the eight members of the National Liberation Council government formed afterward and made vice chairman.

He remained in his office as the head of the police force in the new designation as Inspector-General of Police and in addition, assumed ministerial responsibility for the interior between 1966 and 1969 and foreign affairs between 1967 and 1968.

On 3 September 1969, a presidential commission was formed which carried out presidential functions during the 1969 democratic transitional process in Ghana. Harlley was  a member of the three-man commission whose other members were Lt. General Akwasi Afrifa and Lt. General Albert Kwesi Ocran. This commission remained in place even after the handover to the democratically elected Progress Party government of Kofi Abrefa Busia. On August 7, 1970, the commission was replaced by an interim President, Nii Amaa Ollennu.

Honours
 In 1970, he received an LL.D from the University of Ghana.

Personal life and death
Harlley was married to Nancy Harlley (née Woanyah). Following his service in government, Harlley spent the rest of his in his hometown Anyako in the Volta Region. He died on 18 February 1982 in Anyako where he was buried.

References

External links
Ghana-pedia webpage - Operation Cold Chop: The Fall Of Kwame Nkrumah
Picture of Members of the National Liberation Council
Gallery of Ghana Inspector Generals of Police

1919 births
Ghanaian police officers
Foreign ministers of Ghana
Interior ministers of Ghana
Inspectors general
Alumni of the Accra Academy
Ghanaian Presbyterians
1982 deaths